Uta Briesewitz (born 1967) is a German cinematographer and television director. She is known for her collaborations with film director Brad Anderson.

Biography 
Briesewitz was born in Leverkusen, Germany. She was exposed to film at an early age, watching them on German television, eventually cultivating a preference for French Nouvelle Vague and Italian cinema. In an interview, she recounted that Francois Truffaut's Day for Night, The Story of Adele H and The Man Who Loved Women, were some of the films that made strong impressions on her as a child. Later, Briesewitz considered training to be a painter, but decided it was too isolated as a career.

She had an internship with a German television company, before she applied and completed a cinematography program at AFI Conservatory.

In 2007 she won a Women in Film Crystal + Lucy Awards in the category Kodak Vision award.

Filmography

Film

Television

References

External links
 

German cinematographers
German television directors
German women cinematographers
AFI Conservatory alumni
1967 births
Living people
People from Leverkusen
Mass media people from North Rhine-Westphalia
Women television directors